Anthene versatilis, the versatile ciliate blue, is a butterfly in the family Lycaenidae. It is found in Nigeria, Cameroon, Gabon and the Democratic Republic of the Congo. The habitat consists of primary forests.

Subspecies
Anthene versatilis versatilis (Cameroon, Gabon, Democratic Republic of the Congo)
Anthene versatilis bitje (Druce, 1910) (Nigeria: south and the Cross River loop, Cameroon)

References

Butterflies described in 1910
Anthene